Manuela Nuñez de Almeida was an eighteenth-century British Jewish poet.

Biography
She was born in London into a family of Sephardic origin. She was the matriarch of a learned family, whose members formed part of a literary circle surrounding Haham David Nieto. Her son Mordecai Nuñez de Almeida was the patron of the Spanish poet . Together with her two daughters, Benvenida Cohen Belmonte and Sara de Fonseca Pina y Pimentel, wife of Manuel Fonseca Pina, she wrote Spanish verses prefacing Laguna's work.

References

Attribution
 

17th-century births
18th-century deaths
18th-century British women writers
18th-century English poets
Spanish-language poets
English Jewish writers
18th-century Sephardi Jews
English people of Spanish-Jewish descent
Jewish women writers